Richard is an unincorporated community in Calhoun County, Iowa, in the United States.

History
Richard (formerly Richards)  was laid out and platted in June 1900. It was named for its founders, E. A. and Bessie P. Richards.

References

Unincorporated communities in Calhoun County, Iowa
Unincorporated communities in Iowa